Escape Velocity is a 1999 Canadian thriller film, directed by Lloyd A. Simandl.

Premise
A psychotic escaped prisoner takes over a deep-space observatory manned by a scientist, his wife and teenager daughter.

Cast
 Wendy Crewson as Billie, Ronnie's Mom
 Peter Outerbridge as Lee Nash / Carter
 Patrick Bergin as Cal, Ronnie's Dad and Captain of The Harbinger Spaceship
 Patrik Stanek as Jansen, Escaped Convict
 Michelle Beaudoin as Veronica "Ronnie"
 Pavel Bezdek as Lars, Escaped Convict
 Emil Linka as Glenn, Escaped Convict
 Gerard Whelan as Liam, Escaped Convict 
 Robert Russell as Mesa Verde Prison Warden
 Mike McGuffie as Mesa Verde Prison Executioner
 David Nykl as Father Russell

External links
 
 

1999 films
Canadian thriller films
English-language Canadian films
1990s English-language films
1990s Canadian films